The 2002 Greek Cup Final was the 58th final of the Greek Cup. The match took place on 27 April 2002 at Olympic Stadium. The contesting teams were AEK Athens and Olympiacos. It was AEK Athens' seventeenth Greek Cup Final in their 78-year history and Olympiacos' twenty ninth Greek Cup Final and second consecutive in their 77 years of existence. For the 5th and last time, the President of the Republic, Konstantinos Stephanopoulos, honored the final with his presence, awarding the trophy to the players of the winning team.

Venue

This was the fifteenth Greek Cup Final held at the Athens Olympic Stadium, after the 1983, 1984, 1985, 1986, 1987, 1988, 1989, 1990, 1993, 1994, 1995, 1996, 1999 and 2000 finals.

The Athens Olympic Stadium was built in 1982. The stadium is used as a venue for Olympiacos and was used for Panathinaikos, AEK Athens and Greece in various occasions. Its current capacity is 80,000 and hosted 3 UEFA European Cup/Champions League Finals in 1983, 1994 and 2007, a UEFA Cup Winners' Cup Final in 1987 and the 1991 Mediterranean Games.

Background
AEK Athens had reached the Greek Cup Final sixteen times, winning ten of them. The last time that played in a Final was in 2000, where they had won Ionikos by 3–0.

Olympiacos had reached the Greek Cup Final twenty eight times, winning twenty of them. The last time that they had won the Cup was in 1999 (2–0 against Panathinaikos). The last time that had played in a Final was in 2001, where they had lost to PAOK by 4–2.

Route to the final

Match

Details

See also
2001–02 Greek Football Cup

References

2002
Cup Final
Greek Cup Final 2002
Greek Cup Final 2002
Sports competitions in Athens
April 2002 sports events in Europe